Methylselenocysteine, also known as Se-methylselenocysteine, is an analog of S-methylcysteine in which the sulfur atom is replaced with a selenium atom.  It is an inhibitor of DMBA-induced mammary tumors and a "chemopreventive agent that blocks cell cycle progression and proliferation of premalignant mammary lesions and induces apoptosis of cancer cell lines in culture."

Apoptosis has been proposed as the most plausible mechanism for the chemopreventive activities of selenocompounds.  Se-Methylselenocysteine was more efficient at inducing apoptosis than selenite, but was less toxic. The "selenite-induced cell death could be derived from necrosis rather than apoptosis, since selenite did not significantly induce several apoptotic phenomena, including the activation of caspase-3."

In the Nutritional Prevention of Cancer Trial, selenized yeast resulted in "a reduction in the incidence of prostate cancer and in total cancer incidence"; subsequent anticancer studies using selenomethionine did not show any benefit against cancer; but, selenized yeast contains both selenomethionine and methylselenocysteine.

Methylselenocysteine is found in selenized yeast, and many vegetables: "As much as 80% of the total selenium" found in 
Allium species (onion, leek, garlic, ramps) Brassica species (broccoli, radish, Brussels sprouts, cabbage), and milk vetch (Astragalus species, Fabaceae)  "is present as Se-methylselenocysteine." The bioavailability of selenium from Se-methylselenocysteine, "is likely to be similar to that from other organic selenium compounds."  Specifically, "It is converted via the action of β-lyase, to methylselenol and then to hydrogen selenide,  which is also the key metabolite derived from"  all other common forms of selenium.  But EFSA concluded that "given the absence of human studies on Se-methylselenocysteine, the relatively sparse database on the  bioavailability of selenium from this source and the limited data on the safety of this source compared with other selenium compounds, the Upper Limit for selenium defined by the Scientific Committee on Food cannot be used for judging its safety."

References

Amino acid derivatives
Organoselenium compounds
Selenium(−II) compounds
Selenoethers